Salem is the county seat of Dent County, Missouri, United States. The population was 4,608 at the 2020 census, which allows Salem to become a Class 3 city in Missouri; however, the city has chosen to remain a Class 4 city under Missouri Revised Statutes. Salem is located a few miles north of the Ozark Scenic Riverways and close to Montauk State Park, which contains the headwaters of the Current River.

The name Salem is derived from the Hebrew word Shalom, meaning "peace".

History

Dent County was first explored by Dustin Counts and settled between 1818 and 1829. In 1851, the Missouri Assembly created Dent County from portions of Crawford and Shannon counties. It was named for early settler Lewis Dent, who served as the first representative. A log courthouse, built circa 1851–1852, was Dent County's first and was located on the Wingfield farm northeast of Salem. W. P. Williams became the first mayor of Salem in 1860, just after the Missouri State Legislature passed laws regarding the administration of village government.  During the American Civil War, units of the 5th Missouri State Militia would sometimes garrison in Salem. Village governments were suspended during the Civil War.  In 1881, Salem was incorporated as a town.
The town's museums include the Dent County Museum, the Ozark Natural & Cultural Resource Center, the Bonebrake Center of Nature and History, and a historic Downtown Walking Tour.

The Dam and Spillway in the Hatchery Area at Montauk State Park, Dent County Courthouse, Lower Parker School, Montauk State Park Open Shelter, Nova Scotia Ironworks Historic District, Old Mill at Montauk State Park, and W.A. Young House are listed on the National Register of Historic Places.

Geography

Climate
Salem has a humid subtropical climate (Köppen climate classification Cfa). It has cool winters and warm summers with consistent rainfall year-round.

Demographics

2010 census

As of the census of 2010, there were 4,950 people, 2,152 households, and 1,248 families living in the city. The racial makeup of the city was 95.94% White, 0.53% Black or African American, 1.13% Native American, 0.16% Asian, 0.08% Native Hawaiian or Pacific Islander, 0.32% from other races, and 1.84% from two or more races. Hispanic or Latino of any race were 1.17% of the population.

There were 2,152 households, of which 28.5% had children under the age of 18 living with them, 40.1% were married couples living together, 13.6% had a female householder with no husband present, 4.3% had a male householder with no wife present, and 42.0% were non-families. 37.3% of all households were made up of individuals, and 17.9% had someone living alone who was 65 years of age or older. The average household size was 2.24 and the average family size was 2.93.

The median age in the city was 39.5 years. 24.2% of residents were under the age of 18; 8.8% were between the ages of 18 and 24; 22.5% were from 25 to 44; 24.1% were from 45 to 64; and 20.3% were 65 years of age or older. The gender makeup of the city was 46.5% male and 53.5% female.

2000 census
As of the census of 2000, there were 4,854 people, 2,115 households, and 1,269 families living in the city. The population density was 1,607.4 people per square mile (620.6/km). There were 2,368 housing units at an average density of 784.2 per square mile (302.7/km). The racial makeup of the city was 97.05% White, 0.74% African American, 0.54% Native American, 0.16% Asian, 0.25% from other races, and 1.26% from two or more races. Hispanic or Latino of any race were 0.82% of the population.

There were 2,115 households, out of which 28.2% had children under the age of 18 living with them, 44.3% were married couples living together, 12.7% had a female householder with no husband present, and 40.0% were non-families. 36.3% of all households were made up of individuals, and 21.1% had someone living alone who was 65 years of age or older. The average household size was 2.21 and the average family size was 2.86.

In the city, the population was spread out, with 24.4% under the age of 18, 8.9% from 18 to 24, 24.7% from 25 to 44, 18.9% from 45 to 64, and 23.1% who were 65 years of age or older. The median age was 39 years. For every 100 females, there were 81.6 males. For every 100 females age 18 and over, there were 74.9 males.

The median income for a household in the city was $21,648, and the median income for a family was $29,460. Males had a median income of $27,006 versus $17,285 for females. The per capita income for the city was $12,766. About 12.9% of families and 17.4% of the population were below the poverty line, including 22.8% of those under age 18 and 11.3% of those age 65 or over.

Education
Salem High School is the only high school located within the city. Salem is also home to an extension of Southwest Baptist University.

Salem has a lending library, the Salem Public Library.

Notable people

James Yancy Callahan, delegate to the United States House of Representatives representing the Oklahoma Territory (1887-1899)
Ben Cantwell, MLB baseball player
Orien Crow, NFL football player
William P. Elmer, U.S. Representative from Missouri's 8th congressional district (1943-1945)
Ralph K. Hofer, World War II Royal Canadian and (later) American fighter pilot, killed in action and recipient of the Distinguished Flying Cross (United States)
Elmer Jacobs, MLB baseball player
Doug Dillard and Mitchell F. Jayne of The Dillards, bluegrass musicians
Paulette Jiles, novelist and poet
Jason T. Smith, U.S. Representative from Missouri's 8th congressional district (2013- )

See also
National Register of Historic Places listings in Dent County, Missouri

References

External links

 Salem, Missouri Chamber of Commerce website
 Historic maps of Salem in the Sanborn Maps of Missouri Collection at the University of Missouri

Cities in Dent County, Missouri
County seats in Missouri
Cities in Missouri